The GNU Core Utilities or coreutils is a package of GNU software containing implementations for many of the basic tools, such as cat, ls, and rm, which are used on Unix-like operating systems. 

In September 2002, the GNU coreutils were created by merging the earlier packages textutils, shellutils, and fileutils, along with some other miscellaneous utilities. In July 2007, the license of the GNU coreutils was updated from GPL-2.0-or-later to GPL-3.0-or-later.

The GNU core utilities support long options as parameters to the commands, as well as the relaxed convention allowing options even after the regular arguments (unless the  environment variable is set). Note that this environment variable enables a different functionality in BSD.

See the List of GNU Core Utilities commands for a brief description of included commands.

Alternative implementation packages are available in the FOSS ecosystem, with a slightly different scope and focus, or license.  For example, BusyBox which is licensed under GPL-2.0-only, and Toybox which is licensed under 0BSD.

See also

GNU Binutils
List of GNU Core Utilities commands
List of Unix commands
Toybox, a 0BSD licensed, all-in-one Linux command line utility used in Android.
util-linux, a set of approximately 100 basic Linux system utilities not included in GNU Core Utilities, such as mount, fdisk, more, and kill.

Notes

References

External links
 
 The Heirloom Toolchest - An alternative set of utilities
 opensource.com article: gnu-core-utilities on  4 Apr 2018  by David Both (Correspondent) 

Free software programmed in C
Free system software
Core Utilities
Unix software